American Samoa competed at the 2012 Summer Olympics in London, United Kingdom from July 27 to August 12, 2012. This nation marked its seventh appearance at the Olympics. Five athletes from American Samoa were selected to the Games; all of them were given under Universality slots and tripartite invitation, without being qualified. Freestyle swimmer Ching Maou Wei became the nation's first male flag bearer at the opening ceremony since 1996. Among the sports played by the athletes, American Samoa also marked its Olympic return in wrestling after 16 years. American Samoa, however, has yet to win its first ever Olympic medal.

Athletics

Athletes from American Samoa have so far achieved qualifying standards in the following athletics events (up to a maximum of 3 athletes in each event at the 'A' Standard, and 1 at the 'B' Standard):

Men

Judo

American Samoa has had 1 judoka invited.

Swimming

Swimmers have so far achieved qualifying standards in the following events (up to a maximum of 2 swimmers in each event at the Olympic Qualifying Time (OQT), and potentially 1 at the Olympic Selection Time (OST)):

Men

Women

Wrestling

American Samoa has qualified one quota place.

Men's freestyle

Officials
 President: Mr. Kenneth Tupua
 Secretary General: Mr. Etisone Imo, Jr.
 Chef de Mission: Mr. Kent Yamada
 Physiotherapist: Mr. Chris Spalding, ATC
 Athletics Coach: Mr. Valusia Talataina
 Judo Team Leader: Ms. Michaelle Vargas
 Swimming Team Leader: Ms. Erika Radewagen
 Swimming Coach: Mr. Robert Scanlan
 Wrestling Coach: Mr. Ethan Lake

References

External links
 
 Samoa News Olympics Update

Nations at the 2012 Summer Olympics
2012
2012 in American Samoan sports